Carmela González Troncoso (born 1982 in Vigo) is a Spanish telecommunication engineer and researcher specialized in privacy issues, and an LGBT+ activist. She is currently a tenure track assistant professor at École Polytechnique Fédérale de Lausanne (EPFL) in Switzerland and the head of the SPRING lab (Security and Privacy Engineering Laboratory). Troncoso gained recognition for her leadership of the European team developing the DP-3T protocol that aims at the creation of an application to facilitate the tracing of COVID-19 infected persons without compromising on the privacy of citizens. Currently she is also member of the Swiss National COVID-19 Science Task Force in the expert group on Digital Epidemiology. In 2020, she was listed among Fortune magazine's 40 Under 40.

Career 
Troncoso studied engineering at University of Vigo and in 2006 graduated in telecommunication engineering. She went to KU Leuven to work on her PhD on "Design and analysis methods for privacy technologies" under the supervision of Bart Preneel and Claudia Díaz. She continued at KU Leuven as a post-doc before joining Gradiant, the Galician Research and Development Center in Advanced Telecommunications, as a Security and Privacy Technical Lead. In October 2015 Troncoso joined the IMDEA Software Institute (Spain) as faculty member. Since November 2017 she has been a tenure track assistant professor at the SPRING lab (Security and Privacy Engineering Laboratory) at the School of Computer and Communication Sciences at École Polytechnique Fédérale de Lausanne (EPFL) in Switzerland.

Research 
Troncoso's research focuses on technologies enabling the development of socially responsible systems such as machine learning, privacy evaluation and privacy-preserving systems:

 Machine learning: Troncoso studies the impact of machine learning algorithms on daily activities of contemporary society, both the improvements as well as the disadvantages. Employing machine learning she builds tools helping to enhance system designs and find ethical designs defending against machine learning-based attacks on privacy.
 Privacy evaluation: Her lab performs research that helps user to authorize to better understand how much information they reveal, and to enable software developers to achieve their goals without endangering the privacy of users.
 Engineering privacy-preserving systems: Troncoso also works on developing frameworks assisting engineers to build privacy-preserving systems and methodologies that allow them to assess in a systematic way about the design and the evaluation of privacy-preserving technologies.

Based on her research, and together with International Consortium of Investigative Journalists (ICIJ) Troncoso developed the opensource collaborative data analysis tool Datashare. Datashare was used in the analysis of the Luanda Leaks.

Covid-19 pandemic 
In 2020, during the crisis of the Covid-19 pandemic, she leads a team of more than 30 people from eleven European institutions working to develop the DP-3T protocol under the umbrella of the Pan-European Privacy-Preserving Proximity Tracing (PEPP-PT) to create a computer application that tracks contacts and at the same time respects privacy with the aim of letting citizens know if they have been close to someone who days later tests positive for the virus. She is first author of white paper on the application of the DP-3T protocol. Google stated that it took inspiration from the DP-3T protocol.

Through her work the DP-3T protocol  and on the SwissCovid app system during the Covid-19 Troncoso was featured in several Swiss and international news outlets. As an expert of the topic she also appeared on a number of panels and events such as the IMPACT2020 conference and the International Committee of the Red Cross' release of Data Protection Handbook for Humanitarian Action.

Distinctions 
In September 2020, Troncoso joined the ranks of "40 influential people" (40 Under 40) in the category technology nominated by the  Fortune magazine.

Since 2020 Troncoso has been a member of the Swiss National COVID-19 Science Task Force, the scientific corona advisory board of the Swiss Federal Council and the cantons. She is a member of the expert group on Digital Epidemiology.

She is an awardee of the ERCIM WG STM Best Ph.D. Thesis Award (2011), the CNIL-INRIA Privacy Protection Award 2017 (Paper: Engineering privacy by design reloaded) and the Google Security and Privacy Research Award (2019).

Selected works 
 
 Gürses, S., Troncoso, C. and Diaz, C., 2011. Engineering privacy by design. Computers, Privacy & Data Protection, 14(3), p. 25. PDF.
 
 
 Balasch, J., Rial, A., Troncoso, C., Preneel, B., Verbauwhede, I. and Geuens, C., 2010, August. PrETP: Privacy-Preserving Electronic Toll Pricing. In USENIX security symposium (Vol. 10, pp. 63–78). PDF.
 Pyrgelis, A., Troncoso, C. and De Cristofaro, E., 2017. Knock knock, who's there? Membership inference on aggregate location data. arXiv preprint .
 
 Mittal, P., Olumofin, F.G., Troncoso, C., Borisov, N. and Goldberg, I., 2011, August. PIR-Tor: Scalable Anonymous Communication Using Private Information Retrieval. In USENIX Security Symposium (p. 31). PDF.

References

External links 

 
 Website of the SPRING Lab

LGBT academics
Spanish scholars
Academic staff of the École Polytechnique Fédérale de Lausanne
Spanish women activists
21st-century women engineers
Spanish women computer scientists
Spanish LGBT scientists
21st-century Spanish scientists
Spanish LGBT rights activists
1982 births
Living people
Spanish women engineers
Women civil rights activists
21st-century Spanish LGBT people